Hutchinson High School is a public secondary school in Hutchinson, Kansas, United States, operated by Hutchinson USD 308 public school district.  This school is the only public high school within the city limits of Hutchinson.  The enrollment for 2020-2021 was 1,430 students.  The school mascot is the Salthawk and the school colors are blue and gold.  As of the 2020–2021 school year, the principal is Ryan Ewy and the activities director is Kevin Armstrong.

Hutchinson High School is a member of the Kansas State High School Activities Association. Athletic teams compete in the 5A and 6A divisions and are known as the "Salthawks". Extracurricular activities are also offered in the form of performing arts, school publications, and clubs. The Salthawk football team won six consecutive state championships from 2004 to 2009.

History

The first high school in Hutchinson was established in 1872 to help educate the growing population of Hutchinson. The first high school graduating class occurred in 1882. Due to the demand for more space, a new high school was constructed in 1891 at 5th and Maple. This location would last for nineteen years. In 1910, the city voted to approve the construction of a new $125,000 high school, located at 7th and Walnut. In 1930, the Salt Hawk (shortened to Salthawk in the 1990s) became the school's official mascot. The high school would remain in this location until 1960 when, due to inadequate conditions, Hutchinson High moved to its current location at 13th and Severance.

School layout

Hutchinson High School consists of several halls. A Hall is the longest hall in the school. It is attached to the Salthawk Activity Center at the west and runs to the east where it turns north toward the cafeteria. A Hall is bisected by the recently constructed M Hall which houses upgraded drama, band, orchestra and choir rooms. The "M-Hall Expansion" also included the construction of a new auditorium, allowing for the old one to be repurposed into a learning facility. This also created new space for an upgraded 3-D art room, making use of the previous "backstage" area. Apart from A and M hall, there is B, C, G, F, and V halls. The Hutchinson Career and Vocational Technology Education (HCTEA or V hall) buildings, including the recently constructed T Building, stand alone.  There are three gymnasiums on campus (North Gym, South Gym, and the Main Gym/Salthawk Activity Center, known better as 'the SAC'). Many students attend classes and athletics practices (primarily swimming) at the YMCA close to campus.  Students are also allowed to make the short trip to nearby Hutchinson Community College to take classes.

Extracurricular activities
The Salthawks are classified as a 6A school, the largest classification in Kansas according to the Kansas State High School Activities Association. Hutchinson has won several state championships in various sports.

Athletics

Football
The Salthawks are seven-time state champions in football, having won the state championship in 2004–2009, 2011, and were state runners-up in 2003, 2012, and 2014.  The first four state championships were 6A and the three most recent state championships were 5A. The team has made it to the sub-state level/game since 2002.

Basketball
The Salthawk basketball teams have won boys' championships in 1974, 1975, and 2001, and girls' championships in 1976 and 1985.

Cross Country
In 2009-2010 the cross country team won the AVCTL Championships, becoming regional runner-ups, and placing 3rd in the state 5A championships.

Wrestling
The Salthawk wrestling program won state titles in 1973, 1982, 2002 and 2003. The program has had numerous state placers and state champions.

Other sports
The Salthawk boys' golf team has won state championships in 1942, 1958, 1960, 1974, 1995 and 2005. The Salthawks wrestling team won state titles in 1973, 1982, 2002, and 2003, making it one of the most successful sports in Hutchinson High School history. The boys' track and field team won state titles in 1927, 1928, 1941, 1942, 2000 and 2004.

State championships

* In 1974 Hutchinson High School won both the 2-man & 4-man state golf championships. In those days, trophies were awarded to the winner of both, so their total golf titles could be interpreted as 7 golf titles and 33 titles overall.

Hutchinson High School offers the following sports:

Fall
 Football
 Volleyball
 Boys' Cross-Country
 Girls' Cross-Country
 Girls' Golf
 Boys' Soccer
 Girls' Tennis
 Cheerleading

Winter
 Boys' Swimming
 Boys' Basketball
 Girls' Basketball
 Wrestling
 Boys' Bowling
 Girls' Bowling
 Winter Cheerleading

Spring
 Baseball
 Boys' Golf
 Boys' Tennis
 Girls' Soccer
 Girls' Swimming
 Softball
 Boys' Track and Field
 Girls' Track and Field

School newspaper and yearbook
The Newshawk was the school's official paper. It was published on a monthly basis. However, it is not currently in publication.

Speech and Debate
Hutch High has produced 13 NFL All-Americans since 1986 and has produced 77 national qualifying students since 1972. The debate team placed 1st at state in 2009 and 2010. The debate program has, as of 2019, won 16 state championships.

 The debate team won KSHSAA state championships in 1941, 1944, 1946, 1950, 1951, 1976, 1981, 1982, 1993, 1994, 1996, 1998, 1999, 2007, 2009, and 2010.

Notable alumni

 Jack Banta, former MLB player for the Brooklyn Dodgers
 David Dillon, former CEO of The Kroger Company, former student body president at the University of Kansas
 Geneo Grissom, third round pick in the 2015 NFL Draft for the New England Patriots
 Ben Heeney, fifth round pick in the 2015 NFL draft for the Oakland Raiders
V. John Krehbiel, Ambassador to Finland
 Ronald Parker, screenwriter and movie producer, former director of development for the Producers Circle Company and former vice president of Creative Affairs for Marble Arch Productions
 Fay B. Prickett, U.S. Army major general
 Donald Worster, one of the founders and leading figures in the field of environmental history, Distinguished Foreign Expert and senior professor in the School of History of Renmin University of China

See also
 List of high schools in Kansas
 List of unified school districts in Kansas

References

External links

 Official School Website
 Student Produced Website for Hutchinson High School
 USD308 official website
 USD 308 School District Boundary Map, KDOT

Public high schools in Kansas
Educational institutions established in 1872
Hutchinson, Kansas
Schools in Reno County, Kansas
1872 establishments in Kansas